Kazimierz Franciszek Czarnkowski, (1613/17–1656), of the Nałęcz coat of arms, was a Polish nobleman (szlachcic).

Kazimierz was Colonel of the voivodeships of Greater Poland and castellan of Poznań since 1646. He married Princess Konstancja Lubomirska on February 1, 1637 in Kraków and Anna Konstancja Wejher about 1650.

1610s births
1656 deaths
People from Łęczyca
Clan of Nałęcz